Pannonia Superior, lit. Upper Pannonia, was a province of the Roman Empire. Its capital was Carnuntum. It was one on the border provinces on the Danube. It was formed in the year 103 AD by Emperor Trajan who divided the former province of Pannonia into two parts: Pannonia Superior and Pannonia Inferior. The province included parts of present-day states of Austria, Croatia, Hungary, Slovakia, and Slovenia.

History
It was as governor of the province that Septimius Severus made his bid for the Roman Imperial throne in April 193 CE.

In 308 Emperor Diocletian chaired a historic meeting with his co-emperors Maximian and Galerius in Carnuntum, to solve the rising tensions within the Tetrarchy. Diocletian and Maximian were both present on 11 November 308, to see Galerius appoint Licinius to be Augustus in place of Valerius Severus, who had died at the hands of Maxentius. Galerius ordered Maximian, who had attempted to return to power after his own retirement, to step down permanently. At Carnuntum people begged Diocletian to return to the throne, to resolve the conflicts that had arisen through Constantine the Great's rise to power and Maxentius' usurpation. Diocletian's reply: "If you could show the cabbage that I planted with my own hands to your emperor, he definitely wouldn't dare suggest that I replace the peace and happiness of this place with the storms of a never-satisfied greed."

Cities
Some of the important cities in Upper Pannonia were:
 Vindobona (today Vienna in Austria)
 Siscia (today Sisak in Croatia)
 Iovia Botivo (today Ludbreg in Croatia)
 Aquae Balissae (today Daruvar in Croatia)
 Andautonia (today Ščitarjevo in Croatia)
 Savaria (today Szombathely in Hungary)
 Scarbantia (today Sopron in Hungary)
 Arrabona (today Győr in Hungary)
 Poetovio (today Ptuj in Slovenia)

Later usage
The northern part of the 8th-century Frankish March of Pannonia was also called Upper Pannonia.
The name can be found even much later in a similar, but wider, meaning. E.g. Otto von Freising (Chron. 6, 15) uses it to refer to Austria (i.e. Austria proper) in the 12th century.

List of Roman governors 
 Publius Metilius Nepos 106-107/8
 Lucius Minicius Natalis 113/114-117/118
 Lucius Cornelius Latinianus c. 126
 Cornelius Proculus 130/131-133/134
 Lucius Aelius Caesar 136-137
 Titus Haterius Nepos 137-c. 141
 Marcus Pontius Laelianus Larcius Sabinus c. 145-c. 150
 Claudius Maximus c. 150-c. 155
 Marcus Nonius Macrinus c. 159-c. 162
 Lucius Dasumius Tullius Tuscus c. 162-c. 166
 Marcus Iallus Bassus Fabius Valerianus c. 166-c. 169
 Gaius Julius Commodus Orfitianus c. 169-c. 172
 Sextus Quintilius Maximus c. 175-c. 179
 Gaius Vettius Sabinianus Julius Hospes between 182 and 191
 Prastina Messalinus after 185 to 191
 Septimius Severus 191-193
 Lucius Fabius Clio 197-c. 201
 Tiberius Claudius Claudianus between 201 and 207
 Egnatius Victor c. 207
 Cassius Dio between 226 and 229

See also
Pannonia
Roman provinces
Roman Empire

References

Sources
 Epitome de Caesaribus (translation) ca. 395.
 Barnes, Timothy D., Constantine and Eusebius. Cambridge, Massachusetts: Harvard University Press, 1981. 
Lenski, Noel. "The Reign of Constantine." In The Cambridge Companion to the Age of Constantine, edited by Noel Lenski, 59–90. New York: Cambridge University Press, 2006. Hardcover  Paperback 
Odahl, Charles Matson. Constantine and the Christian Empire. New York: Routledge, 2004. Hardcover  Paperback

External links
Unrv.com: Roman Empire — Pannonia
Geocities.com: Map of Pannonia Superior

 
Superior
Provinces of the Roman Empire
Austria in the Roman era
Croatia in the Roman era
Bosnia and Herzegovina in the Roman era
Hungary in the Roman era
Slovenia in the Roman era
Slovakia in the Roman era
History of Carniola
States and territories established in the 100s
States and territories disestablished in the 3rd century
100s establishments in the Roman Empire
290s disestablishments in the Roman Empire